Mayajalam is a 2006 Indian Telugu film directed by S. V. Krishna Reddy and starring Srikanth and Poonam Kaur (Deepa).

Plot
MP Pradeep decides to get his eccentric son Chatrapathi married as quickly as possible and heads to famed marriage broker and planner Vamsi, who is known for managing all parts of weddings with his team through bumper offers. When a big doctor and owner of a super specialty hospital comes in looking for a match for his daughter Swathi, Vamsi gives them Chatrapathi's details. However, Swathi receives Vamsi's photo by mistake and, already smitten by him from a previous chance meeting, falls in love and agrees to the marriage. It turns out both fathers have dark secrets; Pradeep is engaged in various corrupt and criminal activities and has killed two witnesses to cover up his crimes, while the doctor possesses fake degrees and tricks people into getting an operation so that he can kill them and steal their organs to sell illegally. When Vamsi's brother, an honest police officer, investigates the MP, he is beaten and locked in a room with a broken telephone being his only hope to contact the outside world.

The two witnesses' souls become ghosts and find the ghosts of two of the doctor's victims in his farmhouse. When the wedding is decided to be held there, the ghosts use their powers to possess people to take revenge, disrupting the proceedings and ultimately leading to Swathi disclosing her love of Vamsi. Vamsi tries to rectify the situation, but his brother finally gets a call through to him and discloses what Pradeep did, so he fights Pradeep to get him to disclose where his brother is. While he rescues his brother, both fathers conspire to get their kids married while he's gone; the ghosts intervene and make them confess their crimes while the wedding videographer films them, ultimately sending them to prison for life. The film ends with Vamsi and Swathi happily married.

Cast

Srikanth as Vamsi
Deepa (Debut) as Swati Rajender
Pradeep Rawat as MP Pradeep
Brahmanandam as Ghost
Ali as Ghost
Venu Madhav as Ghost
Krishna Bhagavan as Ghost
Shayaji Shinde as Doctor
Shafi as Chhatrapati
Ravi Prakash as Vamsi's brother
Nakuul Mehta
Gundu Hanumantha Rao
Mallikarjuna Rao
Ashok Kumar
Sivaji Raja
Duvvasi Mohan
Babu Mohan
Tanikella Bharani
Geetha
Hema
Uttej
J. V. Ramana Murthy
Giri Babu
L.B. Sriram
Tirupathi Prakash
Ganesh
Apoorva
Gundu Sudarshan
Kishore Raati
Jyothi

Soundtrack 
Music by S. V. Krishna Reddy.
"Ringingakka" -  S P Eshwar, Tina Kamal
"Abbai" - Kushi Muralidhar, Sumangali
" If You Want" - Ganga, Sagar
"Hot Summer" - Devi Sri Prasad
"Teeyaga" - Kaundinya, Sankrithi

Reception
A critic from Indiaglitz called the film a "mixed fare".

References

2006 films
2000s Telugu-language films
Indian supernatural films
Films directed by S. V. Krishna Reddy
Films scored by S. V. Krishna Reddy